The Stockholms Stora Pris is a Group 3 flat horse race in Sweden open to thoroughbreds aged four years or older. It is run over a distance of 1,750 metres (1 mile and 165 yards) at Bro Park from 2016 (earlier at Täby before the closure of the venue), in late May or early June.

History
The event was established in 1930, and its initial prize money was 12,000 kronor. The first winner was called St Hans.

For a period the Stockholms Stora Pris held Listed status. It was promoted to Group 3 level in 2006. It is currently one of three Group races in Sweden, along with the Stockholm Cup International and the Zawawi Cup.

Records
Most successful horse since 1996 (3 wins):
 Hurricane Red - 2015, 2017, 2018

Leading jockey since 1996 (4 wins):

 Jacob Johansen - Tesorero (2002), Hurricane Red (2015, 2017, 2018)

Leading trainer since 1996 (4 wins):

 Lennart Reuterskiöld, Jr. - Peas And Carrots (2008), Hurricane Red (2015, 2017, 2018)
 Niels Petersen - Without Fear (2013), Bank Of Burden (2014), Kick On (2020), King David (2022)

Winners since 1996

See also

 List of Scandinavian flat horse races

References

 Racing Post / tabygalopp.se:
 , 1998, 1999, 2000, 2001, 2002, 2003, 2004, 
 galopp-sieger.de – Stockholms Stora Pris.
 horseracingintfed.com – International Federation of Horseracing Authorities – Stockholms Stora Pris (2018).
 pedigreequery.com – Stockholms Stora Pris – Täby.

Open middle distance horse races
Sport in Stockholm
Horse races in Sweden
1930 establishments in Sweden
Recurring sporting events established in 1930